Ghostyhead (stylized as GHoSTYhead) is the seventh studio album by the artist Rickie Lee Jones. It was released in 1997 on Warner Bros. Records.

Track listing 
All tracks composed by Rickie Lee Jones; except where indicated
"Little Yellow Town" – 6:54
"Road Kill" – 4:41
"Matters" (Jones, Lee Cantelon) – 6:04
"Firewalker" – 3:56
"Howard" (Jones, Rick Boston) – 4:45
"Ghostyhead" – 5:36
"Sunny Afternoon" (Jones, Rick Boston) – 3:54
"Scary Chinese Movie" – 6:19
"Cloud of Unknowing" (Jones, Rick Boston) – 7:03
"Vessel of Light" (Jones, Rick Boston) – 6:30

Personnel
Rickie Lee Jones – guitar, bass, percussion, organ, piano
Rick Boston – guitar, bass, percussion, organ, piano, loops, programming
Boss Doctor – additional programming
Robert Devery – rhythm, Korg
John Leftwich – upright bass on "Howard"
Gerri Sutyak – cello on "Firewalker"
David Zeller – sheet metal
Jay Lane – foot trunk, cymbals
Josh Freese – live drums
Janeen Rae Heller – saw on "Ghostyhead"
Ayin Es – live drums
Ronnie Ciago – live drums
Lee Cantelon – backward guitar on "Matters"
Technical
Barry Goldberg – engineer, mixing, artwork
John Nelson – second engineer, artwork
Lee Cantelon – artwork, design
Rickie Lee Jones – poster art

References

External links
Discography at Rickie Lee Jones official Web site.

1997 albums
Rickie Lee Jones albums
Reprise Records albums
Trip hop albums by American artists